Issam El Maach (born 1 February 2001) is a professional footballer who plays as a goalkeeper for Eredivisie club FC Twente. Born in the Netherlands, he represents Morocco at under-23 international level.

Club career

Early career
Born in Heerlen and raised in Helmond to Moroccan parents, El Maach began his football career with local club RKSV MULO before being recruited to the youth ranks of VVV-Venlo. In 2016 he moved to the youth academy of SBV Vitesse, from where he was scouted and joined the Ajax Youth Academy a year later.

Ajax
El Maach signed a two-year contract with Ajax in 2017 with an option for an additional year. He made his professional debut with the reserves team Jong Ajax in the Eerste Divisie on 18 January 2018 in a 4–1 loss to RKC Waalwijk. Jong Ajax ended the season as champions of the second division, becoming the first reserves team to win a championship since the introduction of reserves teams in professional football in the Netherlands.

He made his first team debut on 11 January 2019 in a friendly game against Brazilian club Flamengo in the Florida Cup. 

On June 26th, 2020 it was announced that El Maach contract was not going to be extended leaving him eligible to find a new club.

RKC Waalwijk
On 14 July 2021 it was announced that El Maach had signed with Eredivisie club RKC Waalwijk as a free transfer on a 1-year contract.

FC Twente 
On 25 July 2022, El Maach signed with FC Twente on a two-year deal, with an optional year.

International career
El Maach is a youth international for Morocco.

Honours	
Jong Ajax	
 Eerste Divisie: 2017–18

Ajax
 KNVB Cup: 2018–19
 Florida Cup runners-up: 2019

References

External links
 

2001 births
Living people
Footballers from Alphen aan den Rijn
Moroccan footballers
Morocco youth international footballers
Dutch footballers
Dutch sportspeople of Moroccan descent
Association football goalkeepers
AFC Ajax players
Jong Ajax players
RKC Waalwijk players
FC Twente players
Eerste Divisie players
Eredivisie players